Enteromius parablabes is a species of ray-finned fish in the genus Enteromius which is endemic to Benin.

References

 

Enteromius
Taxa named by Jacques Daget
Fish described in 1957